The following is a list of Odonata species found in Taiwan. The total number of species, with damselflies and dragonflies, recorded is 156, within including 14 endemic species and 10 endemic subspecies.

Anisoptera

Aeshnidae

Aeshna
Aeshna petalura taiyal Asahina, 1938 ※endemic subspecies

Anaciaeschna
Anaciaeschna jaspidea (Burmeister, 1839)
Anaciaeschna martini Selys, 1897

Anax
Anax guttatus (Burmeister, 1839)
Anax nigrofasciatus nigrofasciatus Oguma, 1915 
Anax panybeus Hagen, 1867
Anax parthenope julius Brauer, 1865

Cephaleschna
Cephalaeschna risi Asahina, 1981

Gynacantha
Gynacantha bayadera Selys, 1891
Gynacantha hyalina Selys, 1882
Gynacantha japonica Bartenef, 1909
Gynacantha ryukyuensis Asahina, 1962
Gynacantha saltatrix Martin, 1909

Periaeschna magdalena
Periaeschna magdalena Martin, 1909

Planaeschna
Planaeschna ishigakiana flavostria Yeh, 1996 ※endemic subspecies
Planaeschna risi risi Asahina, 1964
Planaeschna taiwana Asahina, 1951 ※endemic species

Polycanthagyna
Polycanthagyna erythromelas (McLachlan, 1896)
Polycanthagyna melanictera (Selys, 1883)
Polycanthagyna ornithocephala (McLachlan, 1896)

Sarasaeschna
Sarasaeschna lieni (Yeh et Chen, 2000) ※endemic species
Sarasaeschna pyanan (Asahina, 1915) ※endemic species
Sarasaeschna tsaopiensis (Yeh et Chen, 2000) ※endemic species

Gomphidae

Anisogomphus
Anisogomphus koxingai Chao, 1954
Anisogomphus maacki (Selys, 1872)

Asiagomphus
Asiagomphus hainanensis (Chao, 1953)
Asiagomphus pacificus (Chao, 1953)
Asiagomphus perlaetus (Chao, 1953)
Asiagomphus septimus (Needham, 1930)

Bumagomphus
Bumagomphus vermicularis (Matin, 1904)

Fukienogomphus
Fukienogomphus prometheus (Lieftinck, 1939)

Gomphidia
Gomphidia confluens Selys, 1878
Gomphidia kruegeri fukienensis Chao, 1955

Heliogomphus
Heliogomphus retroflexus (Ris, 1912)

Ictinogomphus
Ictinogomphus rapax (Rambur, 1842)

Lamelligomphus
Lamelligomphus formosanus (Matsumursa, 1926)

Leptogomphus
Leptogomphus sauteri Ris, 1912
L. s. formosanus Matsumura, 1926 ※endemic species
L. s. sauteri Ris, 1912 ※endemic species

Merogomphus
Merogomphus paviei Martin, 1904

Sieboldius
Sieboldius deflexus (Chao, 1955)

Sinictinogomphus
Sinictinogomphus clavatus (Fabricius, 1775)

Sinogomphus
Sinogomphus formosanus Asahina, 1951 ※endemic species

Stylogomphus
Stylogomphus change Asahina, 1968 ※endemic species
Stylogomphus shirozui shirozui Asahina, 1966 ※endemic species

Stylurus
Stylurus takashii (Asahina, 1966) ※endemic species

Cordulegastridae

Anotogaster
Anotogaster flaveola Lohemann, 1993 ※endemic species
Anotogaster sieboldii (Selys, 1854)

Chlorogomphus
Chlorogomphus brevistigma Oguma, 1926 ※endemic species
Chlorogomphus risi Chen, 1950 ※endemic species
Chlorogomphus splendidus Selys, 1878
Chlorogomphus suzukii (Oguma, 1926)

Cordullidae

Epophthalmia
Epophthalmia elegans (Brauer, 1865)

Hemicordulia
Hemicordulia mindana nipponica Asahina, 1980

Macromia
Macromia chui Asahina, 1968 ※endemic species
Macromia clio Ris, 1916
Macromia urania Ris, 1916

Macromidia
Macromidia ishidai Asahina, 1964

Somatochlora
Somatochlora taiwana Inoue and Yokota, 2001 ※endemic species

Libellulidae

Acisoma
Acisoma panorpoides panorpoides Rambur, 1842

Agrionoptera
Agrionoptera insignis similis Selys, 1879

Brachydiplax
Brachydiplax chalybea flavovittata Ris, 1911

Brachythemis
Brachythemis contaminata (Fabricius, 1793)

Cratilla
Cratilla lineata assidua Lieftinck, 1953

CrocothemisCrocothemis servilia servilia (Drury, 1770)

DeieliaDeielia phaon (Selys, 1883)

DiplacodesDiplacodes trivialis (Rambur, 1842)

HydrobasileusHydrobasileus croceus (Brauer, 1867)

LathrecisataLathrecisata asiatica asiatica (Frbricius, 1798)

LyriothemisLyriothemis flava Oguma, 1915Lyriothemis elegantissima Selys, 1883

MacrodiplaxMacrodiplax cora (Brauer, 1867)

NannophyaNannophya pygmaea Rambur, 1842

NannophyopsisNannophyopsis clara (Needham, 1930)

NeurothemisNeurothemis fulvia (Drury, 1773)Neurothemis ramburii (Kaup, 1866) Neurothemis tullia tullia (Drury, 1773)

OnychothemisOnychothemis testacea tonkinensis Martin, 1904

OrthetrumOrthetrum albistyla speciosum (Uhler, 1858)Orthetrum glaucum (Brauer, 1865)Orthetrum japonicum internum McLachlan, 1894Orthetrum luzonicum (Brauer, 1868)Orthetrum melania (Selys, 1883)Orthetrum pruinosum (Burmeister, 1839)O. p. clelia (Selys, 1878)O. p. neglectum (Rambur, 1842)Orthetrum sabina sabina (Drury, 1770)Orthetrum testaceum testaceum (Burmeister, 1839)Orthetrum triangulare (Selys, 1878)

PantalaPantala flavescens (Fabricius, 1798)

PotamarchaPotamarcha congener congener (Rambur, 1842)

PseudothemisPseudothemis zonata (Burmeister, 1839)

RhyothemisRhyothemis regia regia (Brauer, 1867)Rhyothemis fuliginosa Selys, 1883Rhyothemis severini Ris, 1913Rhyothemis triangularis Kirby, 1889Rhyothemis variegate arria (Drury, 1773)

SympetrumSympetrum baccha baccha (Selys, 1884)Sympetrum darwinianum (Selys, 1883)Sympetrum eroticum ardens (McLachlan, 1894)Sympetrum kunckeli (Selys, 1884)Sympetrum cordulegaster (Selys, 1883)Sympetrum depressiusculum (Selys, 1841)Sympetrum speciosum taiwanum Asahina, 1951 ※endemic subspeciesSympetrum fonscolombei (Selys, 1840)

TholymisTholymis tillarga (Fabricius, 1798)

TrameaTramea transmarina Brauer, 1867T. t. euryale (Selys, 1878)T. t. propinqua (Lieftinck, 1942)Tramea virginia (Rambur, 1842)

TrithemisTrithemis aurora (Burmeister, 1839)Trithemis festiva (Rambur, 1842)Trithemis pallidinervis (Kirby, 1889)

UrothemisUrothemis signata yiei Asahina, 1972 ※endemic subspecies

ZygonyxZygonyx takasago Asahina, 1966

ZyxommaZyxomma obtusum Albarda, 1881 Zyxomma petiolatum Rambur, 1842

Zygoptera

Coenagrionidae

Aciagrion migratumAciagrion migratum (Selys, 1876)

AgriocnemisAgriocnemis femina oryzae Lieftinck, 1962Agriocnemis pygmaea (Rambur, 1842)

CeriagrionCeriagrion auranticum ryukyuanum Asahina, 1967Ceriagrion fallax fallax Ris, 1914Ceriagrion melanurum Selys, 1876Ceriagrion nipponicum Asahina, 1967

IschnuraIschnura asiatica (Brauer, 1865)Ischnura aurora aurora (Brauer, 1865)Ischnura senegalensis (Rambur, 1842)

MortonagrionMortonagrion hirosei Asahina, 1972Mortonagrion selenion (Ris, 1916)

OnychargiaOnychargia atrocyana Selys, 1865

ParacercionParacercion calamorum dyeri (Fraser, 1919)Paracercion sexlineatum (Selys, 1883)Paracercion sieboldii (Selys, 1876)

PseudagrionPseudagrion microcephalum (Rambur, 1842)Pseudagrion pilidorsum pilidorsum (Brauer, 1868)

Platycnemididae

CalicnemiaCalicnemia eximia (Selys, 1863)

CoelicciaCoeliccia cyanomelas Ris, 1912Coeliccia flavicauda flavicauda Ris, 1912 ※endemic subspecies

CoperaCopera ciliata (Selys, 1863)Copera marginipes (Rambur, 1842)

ProtoneuridaeProdasineura croconota (Ris, 1916)

Euphaeidae

Bayadera
'Bayadera brevicauda brevicauda Fraser, 1928 ※endemic subspecies

Euphaea
Euphaea formosa Hagen, 1869 ※endemic species

Lestidae

Indolestes
Indolestes cyaneus (Selys, 1862)

Lestes
Lestes concinnus Hagen, 1862
Lestes praemorsus decipiens Kirby 1893

Orolestes
Orolestes selysi McLachlan, 1895

Megapodagrionidae
Rhipidolestes aculeatus aculeatus Ris, 1912

Synlestidae

Megalestes
Megalestes maai Chen, 1947

Sinolestes
Sinolestes editus Needham, 1930

Calopterygidae

Matrona
Matrona cyanoptera Hamalainen and Yeh, 2000 ※endemic species

Mnais
Mnais andersoni tenuis Oguma, 1913

Neurobasis
Neurobasis chinensis (Linnaeus, 1758)

Psolodesmus
Psolodesmus mandarinus McLachlan, 1870
P. m. dorothea Williamson, 1904 ※endemic subspecies
P. m. mandarinus McLachlan, 1870 ※endemic subspecies

Chlorocyphidae

Aristocypha
Aristocypha baibarana (Matsumura, 1931) ※endemic species

Heliocypha
Heliocypha perforate perforate (Percheron, 1835)

Libellago
Libellago lineata lineata (Burmeister, 1839)

Notes

References

 Yeh W. C., H. I. Chiou, H. C. Tang, J. H. Wu and S. L. Chen. 2007. Three Species of Dragonflies Newly Recorded to Taiwan. Endemic Species Research 9(2)：53-62.
 
 Trueman, John W. H. & Rowe, Richard J. (2008): Tree of Life Web Project – Odonata. Dragonflies and damselflies. Version of 2008-MAR-20. Retrieved 2008-DEC-15.

External links
Anatomy of Odonata
How to identify common dragonflies and damselflies

Taiwan
 
Odonata